Orujov, Orujev or Orudzhev is an Azerbaijani masculine surname, its feminine counterpart is Orujova, Orujeva or Orudzheva. It may refer to
Egor Orudzhev (born 1995), Russian racing driver
Hidayat Orujov (born 1944), Azerbaijani politician and writer
Rustam Orujov (born 1991), Azerbaijani judoka
Sabit Orujov (1912–1981), Azerbaijani politician
Vugar Orujov (born 1971), Azerbaijani-Russian wrestler
Zaid Orudzhev (born 1932), Azerbaijani-born Russian historian

Azerbaijani-language surnames
Patronymic surnames